The 1978 Australian Sports Sedan Championship was an Australian motor racing competition organised by the Confederation of Australian Motor Sport for Group B Sports Sedans. It was the third Australian Sports Sedan Championship title to be awarded by CAMS.

The championship was won by Allan Grice driving a Chevrolet Corvair for Craven Mild Racing.

Calendar
The championship was contested over a seven round series.

Points system
Championship points were awarded on a 9-6-4-3-2-1 basis for the first six places at each round. Points from the six best round results could be retained by each driver.

Where a round was contested over more than one heat, round points were awarded on a 20-16-13-11-10-9-8-7-6-5-4-3-2-1 basis to the first 14 placegetters in each heat. These points were then aggregated to determine the placings for the round. Where more than one driver attained the same total, the relevant round placing was awarded to the driver with the highest placing in the last heat.

Results

Notes and references

External links
 1978 Australian Touring Car (& Sports Sedan) racing images at www.autopics.com.au
 Western Australian Motor Race Results 1978 at www.terrywalkersplace.com 
 1978 Australian Sports Sedan Championship Rd3, www.youtube.com

National Sports Sedan Series
Sports Sedan Championship